Pablo Carreño Busta defeated Hubert Hurkacz in the final, 3–6, 6–3, 6–3 to win the men's singles tennis title at the 2022 Canadian Open. It was his maiden Masters 1000 title.

Daniil Medvedev was the defending champion, but lost in the second round to Nick Kyrgios.

For the first time since 1999 Indian Wells, the top three seeds at a Masters 1000 tournament were defeated in their opening matches. Jannik Sinners loss in the third round guaranteed a maiden Masters 1000 finalist from the bottom half of the draw; Carreño Busta emerged to become that player.

Seeds
The top eight seeds receive a bye into the second round.

Draw

Finals

Top half

Section 1

Section 2

Bottom half

Section 3

Section 4

Seeded players
The following are the seeded players. Seedings are based on ATP rankings as of August 1, 2022. Rank and points before are as of August 8, 2022.

Points for the 2021 tournament were not mandatory and are included in the table below only if they counted towards the player's ranking as of August 8, 2022. Players who are not defending points from the 2021 tournament will instead have their 19th best result replaced by their points from the 2022 tournament. Points from the 2019 tournament are being dropped on August 8, 2022, and are accordingly not reflected in this table.

† This column shows either the player's points from the 2021 tournament or his 19th best result (shown in brackets). Only ranking points counting towards the player's ranking as of August 8, 2022, are reflected in the column.

Withdrawn players 
The following players would have been seeded, but withdrew before the tournament began.

Other entry information

Wild cards

Special exempt
  Yoshihito Nishioka

Protected ranking

Alternates

Withdrawals

Qualifying

Seeds

Qualifiers

Qualifying draw

First qualifier

Second qualifier

Third qualifier

Fourth qualifier

Fifth qualifier

Sixth qualifier

Seventh qualifier

References

 Main draw
 Qualifying draw

National Bank Open